Joshua Keating is a foreign policy analyst, staff writer and author of the World blog at Slate, and a former writer and editor at Foreign Policy magazine.

Media coverage

Keating's Slate posts have been republished in many venues, such as the New Haven Register, the Waco Tribune-Herald, and Press of Atlantic City.

Starting 2013, Keating penned a satirical "If It Happened There" which was self-described as "a regular feature in which American events are described using the tropes and tone normally employed by the American media to describe events in other countries." The series received widespread discussion.

Bibliography

Articles

Books

References

American male journalists
Living people
Smithsonian (magazine) people
Year of birth missing (living people)